The British Universities American Football League (BUAFL), is an American football league contested by university teams in the United Kingdom as part of the British Universities and Colleges Sport (BUCS) organisation. The league was formed by the British American Football Association (BAFA), the national governing body of American football in the UK, in 2007 as the successor to the British Collegiate American Football League, after BAFA withdrew its recognition of the British Student American Football Association which ran that league. The BUAFL has been credited with reviving interest in American football in the UK.

From 2008, the BUAFL was officially associated with the National Football League (NFL), through its partner organisation NFL UK. In 2012, BUAFL's league and teams were absorbed into BUCS after American football became an official BUCS sport. Over the period 2007 to 2014, the BUAFL grew from 42 teams and 2,460 participants to 75 teams and over 4,100 people involved.

League structure

Over the course of the regular season, each team in the Premier and Tier 1 plays between eight regular season games. Each team plays everyone in their division twice; once home and once away. For the 2016/17 season, Tier 2 is broken down into six conferences, five of seven teams and one (South East) of eight; teams in Tier 2 play a six-game season (seven in the South East division), playing each other only once.

Current structure

The latest structure for the BUAFL system was announced by BUCS on 26 August 2016. It consists of two Premier divisions, six regional Tier 1 divisions and six regional Tier 2 divisions. This differs from the standard BUCS structure of five geographical regions below Premier level. The Premier and Tier 1 divisions are considered to be of "high performance" by the BAFA and BUCS. The teams allocated to each division at the start of the 2019–2020 season were:

Premier Divisions

Tier 1 Divisions

Tier 2 Divisions

Earlier structures

The first two full seasons of BUCS American Football preserved the single tier, eight conference structure inherited from BUAFL. In 2014–15, this was changed to a two tier system with the formation of two Premier divisions (North and South), each of five teams. The eight regional conferences, slightly reorganised (in particular, the small Scottish conference became the more balanced Borders conference, including teams from northern England) to contain 8 or 9 teams each, became the second tier. At the same time the Championship was reduced to the top two teams from each Premier division and the Challenge trophy was replaced with cup competitions for North and South Tier 1 divisional winners, with the winners being promoted to the appropriate Premier division.

For the 2015–16 season, the league was split in three tiers. The premier remained organised into North and South, although the top four (of five) in each division now entered the Championship playoff, with the fifth being relegated. The second tier contained 6 geographic division, three Northern (Scottish North, Northern and Midlands) and three Southern (Western, South and Southeastern). The Trophy playoffs took the top two from each division plus the top two remaining teams with the best record from the northern and southern regions, the playoffs were structured with a "northern semi-final" and a "southern semi-final", with the semi-final winners promoted to the respective Premier division regardless of the result in the final. The third tier was organised into 8 divisions, four Northern (Scottish North, Northern, Midlands and North Midlands) and four Southern (Western, South, Southeastern and London). The major change for the 2016–17 season was the reduction to six divisions (and a consequent increase in the number of teams per division) in the third tier (Tier 2), although not fully matching the geographical regions in the second tier (Tier 1).

2021-22 regular season standings

Championship qualification is shaded in green, and relegation is shaded in red; position in the Championship bracket is based on final positions in the two divisions. League position is based on number of points scored, with 2 points for a win, 1 point for a tie and 0 points for a loss

2018-19 Regular Season Standings

Championship qualification is shaded in green, and relegation is shaded in red; position in the Championship bracket is based on final positions in the two divisions. League position is based on number of points scored, with 2 points for a win, 1 point for a tie and 0 points for a loss

2017–18 Final Standings

Championship qualification is shaded in green, and relegation is shaded in red; position in the Championship bracket is based on final positions in the two divisions. League position is based on number of points scored, with 2 points for a win, 1 point for a tie and 0 points for a loss

2016–17 Final Standings

Championship qualification is shaded in green, and relegation is shaded in red; position in the Championship bracket is based on final positions in the two divisions. League position is based on number of points scored, with 2 points for a win, 1 point for a tie and 0 points for a loss

2015–16 Final Standings

Championship qualification is shaded in green, and relegation is shaded in red; position in the Championship bracket is based on final positions in the two divisions. League position is based on number of points scored, with 2 points for a win, 1 point for a tie and 0 points for a loss

2014–15 Final Standings

Championship qualification is shaded in green, and relegation is shaded in red; position in the Championship bracket is based on final positions in the two divisions. League position is based on number of points scored, with 2 points for a win, 1 point for a tie and 0 points for a loss

2013–14 Final Standings

Championship qualification is shaded in green, and Plate qualification is shaded in orange. Seeding is based on number of points scored, with 2 points for a win, 1 point for a tie and 0 points for a loss

National Championship Games

Challenge Trophy/Divisional Cups/National Trophy 

The Challenge Trophy was replaced by the two Divisional Cups for the transitional 2014–15 season, which were replaced in turn by the National Trophy from 2015 to 2016.

League MVP

MVP awards have been given out sporadically at best.

References

External links
 Official BUAFL Website

American football leagues in the United Kingdom
American football leagues in Europe
American football
2007 establishments in the United Kingdom
Sports leagues established in 2007